Litsmetsa is a settlement in Antsla Parish, Võru County in southeastern Estonia.

Elias Lönnrot, author of the Finnish epic Kalevala, stayed in Litsmetsa for six days in September 1844.

References

External links 
Satellite map at Maplandia.com

Villages in Võru County
Kreis Werro